Blagojče Trajkovski (Macedonian: Благојче Трајковски; born 6 October 1986) is a Macedonian handball player who plays for RK Eurofarm Pelister and the Macedonian national team.

References

Living people
Macedonian male handball players
1986 births
Sportspeople from Prilep